Blaze Up the Chalwa is Jamaican reggae artist Sizzla's 14th studio album, released on Charm Records on January 22, 2002.

Track listing

External links
 Review at Discogs
 

2002 albums
Sizzla albums